Bulk soil is soil outside the rhizosphere that is not penetrated by plant roots. The bulk soil is like an ecosystem, it is made up of many things such as: nutrients, ions, soil particles, and root exudates. There are many different interactions that occur between all the members of the bulk soil.  Natural organic compounds are much lower in bulk soil than in the rhizosphere. Furthermore, bulk soil inhabitants are generally smaller than identical species in the rhizosphere.  The main two aspects of bulk soil are its chemistry and microbial community composition.

Chemistry of bulk soil 
Soil is made up of layers called soil horizons, these make up a vertical soil profile. There are five master horizons O, A, E, B, and C. The O horizon contains organic matter, A is considered the topsoil, E is present or absent depending on the type of soil and conditions, B is the subsoil, and C is unconsolidated rock. There are many chemical interactions and properties that are in all the soil. Chemical properties of the bulk soil are organic matter, carbon, nutrient content, cation-exchange capacity (CEC), free ions (cations or anions), pH, and base saturation and organisms. These can impact many chemical processes such as nutrient cycling, soil formation, biological activity, and erosion.

Microbial communities 
Soil is composed of a diverse community of microbes such as: fungi, bacteria, archaea, viruses and microfauna. There are microbes in the bulk soil and the rhizosphere, the variation of microbes increases in the bulk soil and the abundance of microbes increases in the rhizosphere. Some microbes can form symbioses with plants that are beneficial or pathogenic. All these microbes have a special role in many soil processes such as soil formation, organic matter decomposition, nutrient cycling. For example, there are microbes in the rhizosphere (on the plant) that can break down nitrogen, and microbes out in the bulk can break down nitrogen as well. Both have different factors that affect this process.

References 

Soil biology